MBAM may refer to:
 Malwarebytes Anti-Malware, anti-malware software, as its former name
 Montreal Museum of Fine Arts, in Québec, Canada, an abbreviation for its French name, Musée des beaux-arts de Montréal

MBAm may refer to:
 N,N'-Methylenebisacrylamide, a chemical compound, polyacrylamide crosslinker